HMS Swale was a Palmer Type River Class Destroyer ordered by the Royal Navy under the 1903 – 1904 Naval Estimates.  Named after the River Swale north east of York, she was the second ship to carry this name since it was introduced in 1841 for a lighter.

Construction
She was laid down on 23 February 1904 at the Palmers shipyard at Jarrow and launched on 20 April 1905.  She was completed in September 1905.  Her original armament was to be the same as the Turleback torpedo boat destroyers that preceded her.  In 1906 the Admiralty decided to upgrade the armament by landing the five 6-pounder naval guns and shipping three 12-pounder 8 hundredweight (cwt) guns.  Two would be mounted abeam at the fo'c's'le break and the third gun would be mounted on the quarterdeck.

Pre-War
After commissioning she was assigned to China Station in late 1905.

On 30 August 1912 the Admiralty directed all destroyer classes were to be designated by alpha characters starting with the letter 'A'.  The ships of the River Class were assigned to the E Class.  After 30 September 1913, she was known as an E Class destroyer and had the letter ‘E’ painted on the hull below the bridge area and on either the fore or aft funnel.

World War I
Upon her return in early 1914 she was assigned to the 9th Destroyer Flotilla based at Chatham tendered to HMS St George.  The 9th Flotilla was a Patrol Flotilla tasked with anti-submarine and countermining patrols in the Firth of Forth area.  By August she had been redeployed to Scapa Flow Local Flotilla and tendered to HMS Marlborough.  Here she provided anti-submarine and counter mining patrols in defence of the main fleet anchorage.

In November 1916 she was assigned to the 1st Destroyer Flotilla when it was redeployed to Portsmouth.  She was equipped with depth charges for employment in anti-submarine patrols, escorting of merchant ships and defending the Dover Barrage.  In the spring of 1917 as the convoy system was being introduced the 1st Flotilla was employed in convoy escort duties for the English Channel for the remainder of the war.

Disposition
In 1919 she was paid off and laid up in reserve awaiting disposal.  On 23 June 1919 she was sold to Thos. W. Ward of Sheffield for breaking at Preston, Lancashire.

She was not awarded a Battle Honour for her service.

Pennant Numbers

References

Bibliography
 
 
 
 
 
 
 

 

River-class destroyers
1905 ships